"The Power of the Doctor" is the third and final of the 2022 specials of the British science fiction television programme Doctor Who, and was broadcast on BBC One on 23 October 2022. The episode was ordered for the occasion of the 100th anniversary of the launch of the BBC, airing five days after. It was written by Chris Chibnall, and directed by Jamie Magnus Stone.

Jodie Whittaker stars in her final regular appearance as the Thirteenth Doctor, alongside Mandip Gill and John Bishop as her companions Yasmin Khan and Dan Lewis, respectively. The episode also features the return of Jacob Anderson as Vinder and Jemma Redgrave as Kate Stewart, both of whom last appeared in the thirteenth series; Sacha Dhawan as The Master and Patrick O'Kane as Ashad, both of whom last appeared in the twelfth series; previous companions Janet Fielding as Tegan Jovanka and Sophie Aldred as Ace. The ending of the episode features David Tennant, who previously portrayed the Tenth Doctor, appearing as the Fourteenth Doctor.

Plot 
The Thirteenth Doctor and her companions rescue a bullet train in space from a CyberMaster attack, but Dan is nearly killed during the escapade. Having developed a sense of his mortality, Dan parts with the Doctor to get back to living his life. A renegade Dalek contacts the Doctor, offering information about a Dalek plot to destroy humanity.

The Doctor's former companions Tegan Jovanka and Ace investigate the abduction of a dozen of the world's leading seismologists and the addition of Grigori Rasputin's face defacing fifteen famous paintings. Kate Stewart invites the Doctor to UNIT's headquarters to meet Tegan and Ace and discuss their findings. The Doctor clarifies that the new face in the paintings is actually that of the Master, whom she goes to confront at a seismology conference in Naples. 

The Doctor learns the Master and his CyberMasters have allied with the Daleks to end humanity in the present by triggering eruptions from every volcano on Earth simultaneously. The Doctor meets the renegade Dalek, discovering the other Daleks allowed it to contact her in order to capture her, which they do after killing the traitor.

UNIT arrests the Master, who reveals he sent a miniaturised version of Ashad to Tegan, who assumed it was a warning from the Doctor. This enlarges and acts as a portal bringing Ashad and a large number of Cybermen into UNIT HQ, freeing the Master. The Daleks take the Doctor to the Master in 1916 Russia, who uses Gallifreyan technology and the Qurunx (an enslaved energy being) to impose a forced regeneration into him. In her mind, the Doctor encounters manifestations of her First, Fifth, Sixth, Seventh and Eighth incarnations, who inform her it may be possible to undo the forced regeneration with outside help.

An AI program the Doctor created, using images of the Fifth, Seventh, Fugitive, and Thirteenth Doctors, leads Ace to meet with former companion Graham O'Brien and destroy the Dalek volcano machine, Tegan to destroy the Cyberman converter and CyberMasters in UNIT HQ just as they are about to convert Kate, and Yaz and previous ally Vinder to capture the Master and make him undo the Doctor's transformation. Defeated, the Master mortally wounds the Doctor with the Qurunx's energy beam, triggering the regeneration process.

The Doctor takes Yaz home before departing alone. Yaz attends a support group of former companions including Graham, Dan, Kate, Ace, Tegan, Ian Chesterton, Jo Jones and Melanie Bush. The Doctor travels to a cliff where she regenerates into the Fourteenth Doctor, who is alarmed to discover he has become physically similar to his tenth incarnation.

Production

Development 
"The Power of the Doctor" was written by showrunner and executive producer Chris Chibnall and directed by Jamie Magnus Stone. After the first two specials were produced as part of the eight episodes ordered for the thirteenth series, a third feature-length special was later ordered to coincide with the centenary of the BBC and serve as Whittaker's regeneration episode. The BBC described the final episode as an "epic blockbuster special".

Casting and details of the centenary special, without yet revealing the title or airdate, were released after "Legend of the Sea Devils" concluded.

The title of the special, "The Power of the Doctor", was announced on 14 September 2022.

Casting 

Jodie Whittaker stars as the Thirteenth Doctor in her final episode, alongside Mandip Gill as Yasmin Khan and John Bishop as Dan Lewis. The BBC announced Whittaker and Chibnall's departures from the series in July 2021. Gill confirmed that the special would be her final appearance in the series on 3 May 2022.

A trailer for the special was released in April 2022, and confirmed the return of Jacob Anderson as Vinder and Jemma Redgrave as Kate Stewart, both of whom last appeared in the thirteenth series. The Master, played by Sacha Dhawan, and Ashad, played by Patrick O'Kane, who both appeared in the twelfth series, also return. The special also sees the return of former companions Tegan Jovanka, Ace and Graham O'Brien portrayed by Janet Fielding, Sophie Aldred and Bradley Walsh, respectively. The Daleks and the Cybermen also appear.

In cameo roles, the First, Fifth, Sixth, Seventh, Eighth and Fugitive Doctors appear. The First Doctor is portrayed by David Bradley, who previously portrayed the character in the episodes "The Doctor Falls" and "Twice Upon a Time" (both 2017), as well as portraying the original First Doctor actor William Hartnell in the bio-drama An Adventure in Space and Time (2013), while the others are played by their respective original actors: Peter Davison, Colin Baker, Sylvester McCoy, Paul McGann and Jo Martin. According to Chibnall, Fourth Doctor actor Tom Baker was invited to appear in the episode but declined. David Tennant, who previously portrayed the Tenth Doctor, makes a brief appearance as the Fourteenth Doctor.

Former companions Ian Chesterton, Jo Jones and Melanie Bush, portrayed by William Russell, Katy Manning and Bonnie Langford, respectively, also appear in brief cameos.

Filming 
"The Power of the Doctor" was filmed throughout September 2021, directed by Jamie Magnus Stone, concluding on 13 October 2021. Tennant's appearance was filmed around May 2022, directed by Rachel Talalay. Returning showrunner Russell T Davies scripted the incoming Doctor's appearance, with his first line, a reference to his first words as the Tenth Doctor, being suggested by Tennant himself. The background of the regeneration scene, where the Doctor lands the TARDIS atop a cliff and looks out over the sea, was filmed by drone at Durdle Door in Dorset. The Lulworth Estate was not informed of the context of the scene when granting permission for the shoot, and after the episode's broadcast expressed concern that it would encourage viewers to place themselves in danger.

Among the musical cues heard in the episode is "Rasputin" by Germany-based pop and Eurodisco group Boney M, originally released in 1978; the Master, as played by Dhawan, portraying the Russian cleric, uses the song to accompany his impending transformation. Dhawan noted that he was given only "one or two takes" for the set piece, "and we didn't have that long to shoot it."

Broadcast and reception

Broadcast 
"The Power of the Doctor" was first broadcast on 23 October 2022 as part of the BBC's Centenary celebrations, and is the third and final of the three 2022 specials. The special is 87 minutes long.

Ratings 
The episode was watched by 3.71 million viewers overnight, becoming the fourth most-watched programme of the day, with peak viewership reaching 4.04 million. The episode received an Audience Appreciation Index score of 82. The final consolidated ratings for the episode were 5.295 million viewers, making it the fifth most watched programme overall for the week.

Critical reception 
On Rotten Tomatoes, a review aggregator website, 100% of seven critics gave "The Power of the Doctor" a positive review, with an average rating of 7.30 out of 10.

The Radio Times and The Telegraph awarded the episode four out of five stars, the latter calling the episode "an electrifying thrill-ride of non-stop surprises". The Houston Press' review was less positive, calling the episode "an explosive but confusing close" and concluding that "Doctor Who just doesn’t seem to have a present, let alone a future anymore."

Home media 
"The Power of the Doctor" received a separate home media release in Region 2/B on 7 November 2022, in Region 4/B on 7 December 2022, and in Region 1/A on 13 December 2022. The episode is also included in the 2022 specials home media set released in Region 2/B on 7 November 2022.

Soundtrack 

Selected pieces of the score from this special were digitally released on 16 December 2022. A physical CD release containing all 3 soundtracks of the 2022 specials is set for release on 13 January 2023.

Notes

References

External links 

 
 
 

Thirteenth Doctor episodes
2022 British television episodes
British television specials
Dalek television stories
Cybermen television stories
The Master (Doctor Who) television stories
Doctor Who stories set on Earth
Television episodes set in Siberia
Television episodes set in Saint Petersburg
Television episodes set in Bolivia
Doctor Who pseudohistorical serials
Television episodes set in the 1910s
Fiction set in 1916
Fiction set in 2022
Doctor Who multi-Doctor stories
Doctor Who regeneration stories